The Mayor of Masterton is the head of the municipal government of Masterton, New Zealand, and presides over the Masterton District Council. The Mayor is directly elected using First Past the Post.The Mayor is assisted by the Deputy Mayor of Masterton.

The current Mayor is Gary Caffell, elected in October 2022.

List of mayors of Masterton

References

Masterton